Calfee may refer to:

Carolyn Calfee (born 1974), American intensive care physician
Jack Calfee (1941-2011), American economist and author
Calfee Design, California designer and manufacturer of carbon fiber bicycle frames by Craig Calfee
Calfee Park, a stadium in Pulaski, Virginia, used primarily for baseball
Calfee Nunatak, a geographical feature in Antarctica